The ABC-79M (4x4) (Romanian: amfibiu blindat pentru cercetare) armoured personnel carrier has been developed in Romania and uses some automotive components of the TAB-77 (8 × 8) armoured personnel carrier. Although previously known as TABC-79 (transportorul blindat pentru cercetare), it is now known as the ABC-79M.

The ABC-79M is a simplified version of the earlier TAB-77 8x8 armored personal carrier, which was itself a Romanian version of the BTR-70. Both vehicles share several common components.

The ABC-79M is fully amphibious, and is equipped with a single water-jet for propulsion. Other equipment includes infra-red night-vision equipment, winch with 50m of cable and capacity of 5,500 kilograms, and central tire pressure regulation. It is also equipped with an engine preheater, to allow the engine to start in severe cold.

It is equipped for nuclear, chemical, and biological warfare and features a 14.5mm KPVT heavy machine gun with 500 rounds of ammunition as primary armament. This is supplemented by a lighter 7.62mm machine gun with 2000 rounds of ammunition on board. Both weapons are located in a small one-man turret which is identical to turret of the TAB-77 and the earlier TAB-71M

Production is now complete, and the vehicle is no longer available for foreign or domestic sale. It is in use only with second line units of the Romanian military, and there have been no export orders other than a single vehicle purchased by Israel in 1994. No Israeli order followed the trials.

Variants
Variants include:
 TAB-C reconnaissance vehicle
 AM-425 armored personnel carrier
 TAB-79A PCOMA artillery observation vehicle
 TAB-79AR mortar carrier
 ML-A95M vehicle used for the CA-95M self-propelled anti-aircraft weapon

Gallery

Sources

External links 

 www.military-today.com

Romanian Land Forces
Armoured personnel carriers of Romania
Amphibious armoured personnel carriers
Wheeled amphibious armoured fighting vehicles
Military vehicles introduced in the 1970s
Wheeled armoured personnel carriers
Armoured personnel carriers of the post–Cold War period